The 2016 World Cup Taekwondo Team Championships was the 8th edition of the World Cup Taekwondo Team Championships, and was held in Baku, Azerbaijan from December 12 to December 13, 2016.

Teams were allowed to augment their squads with maximum two athletes from other countries.

Medalists

 Foreign athletes are shown in italic.

Men

Preliminary round

Group A

Group B

Knockout round

Women

Preliminary round

Group A

Group B

Knockout round

Mixed

References

1st day results
2nd day results

External links
Official website

World Cup
Taekwondo World Cup
World Cup Taekwondo Team Championships
Taekwondo Championships